Whitford was a provincial electoral district in Alberta mandated to return a single member to the Legislative Assembly of Alberta from 1913 to 1940.

History
The Whitford electoral district was created in 1913 out of the southwest part of the Pakan district and the north part of Vegreville.

In 1940 the district was split between Redwater, Willingdon and Vegreville.

The district was named after the northwest town of Whitford, Alberta.

Members of the Legislative Assembly (MLAs)

Election results

1913 general election

1915 by-election

1917 general election

1921 general election

1922 by-election

1926 general election

1930 general election

1935 general election

By-Election reasons
March 15, 1915—Election of Mr. Andrew Shandro declared void by the courts.
July 10, 1922—Election of Mr. Andrew Shandro declared void by the courts

See also
List of Alberta provincial electoral districts

References

Further reading

External links
Elections Alberta
The Legislative Assembly of Alberta

Former provincial electoral districts of Alberta